The 2001 Safari Rally (formally the 49th Safari Rally Kenya) was the eighth round of the 2001 World Rally Championship. The race was held over three days between 20 July and 22 July 2001, and was won by Mitsubishi's Tommi Mäkinen, his 23rd win in the World Rally Championship.

Background

Entry list

Itinerary
All dates and times are EAT (UTC+3).

Results

Overall

World Rally Cars

Classification

Special stages

Championship standings

FIA Cup for Production Rally Drivers

Classification

Special stages

Championship standings

References

External links 
 Official website of the World Rally Championship

Safari
2001
2001 in Kenyan sport